The Battle of Dollar was an 875 battle fought in Dollar, Scotland between Danish invaders under Thorstein and the men of Alba under Constantine I. The Danes defeated the men of Alba and then occupied Caithness, Sutherlandshire, Ross, and Moray, far to the north of the battle site.

References
George Bruce. Harbottle's Dictionary of Battles. (Van Nostrand Reinhold, 1981).

9th century in Scotland
Dollar
Dollar
Dollar
Scandinavian Scotland
875